The Crunch Bird (El pájaro crujiente) is an animated short by Joe Petrovich, Len Maxwell, and Ted Petok. It won the 1971 Academy Award for Best Animated Short Film.

Joe Petrovich animated the cartoon. Len Maxwell provided the voices for the husband, wife, and pet shop owner. It was followed by the sequel Crunch Bird II in 1975.

Plot
A Narrator tells of a woman searching for a birthday gift for her husband Murray, who has few interests and is largely occupied by his job.  At a pet store, the proprietor offers a "Crunch Bird."  The Crunch Bird devours anything to which its master directs it.  To demonstrate, the proprietor commands, "Crunch Bird!  The chair!" and the bird reduces a wooden straight chair to sawdust within seconds.  The woman is impressed by the bird's talent, buys it, and takes it home.

Murray, exhausted from a hard day at his job, comes home.  His wife shows him his birthday present, the Crunch Bird.  Crabbily, the husband replies, "Crunch Bird, my ass!" The bird swoops toward Murray, and the credits roll...

Legacy
With a running time of only two minutes and thirty two seconds, it is the shortest animated short film ever to receive an Academy Award.

It was also one of the first animation outside New York or California (Michigan) to win an Oscar (Oregon's Closed Mondays from 1974 and Louisiana's The Fantastic Flying Books of Mr. Morris Lessmore from 2010).

The Crunch Bird appeared on the 1982 TV series Jokebook. The short was censored in it as one line was changed from "Crunch Bird, my ass!" to "Crunch Bird, my butt!"

See also
 List of American films of 1971
 Detroit, Michigan
 Culture of Michigan

References

External links

 
 Official Website
 

1971 short films
1971 animated films
1970s American animated films
1970s animated short films
American animated short films
Animated films about birds
Best Animated Short Academy Award winners
1970s English-language films
Animated films about animals
1970s rediscovered films
Rediscovered American films